Hockey Club Severstal is a professional ice hockey team based in Cherepovets, Vologda Oblast, Russia. They are members of the Tarasov Division in the Kontinental Hockey League.

History
Founded in 1956, the club was originally known as Stroitel (Builder) Cherepovets. The name was changed to Metallurg (Metallurgist) Cherepovets in 1959. During the Soviet times, Metallurg played in the low and mid-level divisions of the ice hockey championship. But since the 1990s, not without the financial support of its parent company Severstal (Northsteel), the club joined the ranks of the major professional teams starting with the first season of the then newly established International Hockey League. The club eventually changed its name after the owner in 1994. The biggest success of Severstal to date was in the 2002-2003 Superleague season when they advanced to the final with Lokomotiv Yaroslavl. The home arena is the Ice Palace where home matches are played since 2006/2007 Russian Superleague season. Earlier the Sports-Concert Hall Almaz was the home arena.

Honors

Champions
 Pajulahti Cup (2): 2000, 2006
 Donbass Open Cup (1): 2012
 Hockeyades de la Vallee de Joux (1): 2013

Runners-up
 Russian Superleague (1): 2003
 Russian Superleague (1): 2001

Season-by-season KHL record
Note: GP = Games played; W = Wins; L = Losses; T = Ties; Pts = Points; GF = Goals for; GA = Goals against; P = Playoff

Players

Current roster

All-time KHL scoring leaders 

These are the top-ten point-scorers in franchise history. Figures are updated after each completed KHL regular season.

Note: Pos = Position; GP = Games played; G = Goals; A = Assists; Pts = Points; P/G = Points per game;  = current player

References

External links
  

 
Ice hockey teams in Russia
Sport in Cherepovets
Kontinental Hockey League teams